Lake Welch Parkway, sometimes labeled Lake Welch Drive,  is a scenic road located within Harriman State Park in southern New York in the United States. The highway is located entirely in Rockland County, although it runs close to the border with Orange County. It is inventoried by the New York State Department of Transportation as New York State Route 987A (NY 987A), an unsigned reference route;  however, it is owned by the Palisades Interstate Park Commission. The portion of Lake Welch Parkway that lies south of Tiorati Brook Road is closed during the winter. The parkway is the main route to access all beaches in Harriman State Park: Lake Welch, Lake Tiorati, and Lake Sebago (closed as of 2011).

Route description

Lake Welch Parkway begins, heading north, on the northbound side of Seven Lakes Drive. Although there is no direct connection with southbound Seven Lakes Drive, the section containing the interchange is widened to form a modified traffic circle, allowing U-turns on either side of this divider to permit access from both sides.

The next intersection north is with Johnsontown Road, a dirt road which parallels Lake Welch Parkway, and used to run uninterrupted to Lake Welch, partially along the current parkway's right of way. It is now interrupted after ¾ mile at Pine Meadow Rd, a service road for camp activities, at the next intersection with Lake Welch Parkway. A ½ mile later, the parkway intersects with the St. John's Rd, which is paved; at the same point, the Long Path then crosses the parkway on its way up Nat House Mountain. There is a bridge ⅔ mile later over County Route 106 (CR-106, Gate Hill Road and Kanawauke Rd, formerly NY 210,). There is no interchange between the Parkway and CR-106, but St. John's Rd provides access to CR-106, Lake Welch, and St. John's-in-the-Wilderness Church.

The access road continues south to CR-106, forming another path between the two roads. Lake Welch Parkway continues as a two-lane undivided road for another mile to the vicinity of Tiorati Brook Road, where it widens into a divided highway once again. The parkway connects to the road by way of a Y-interchange with a northbound-to-southbound U-turn. North of Tiorati Brook Road (also known as Cedar Pond Road), the parkway is only open seasonally.

The median ends just east of the interchange with the Palisades Interstate Parkway (exit 16 of the Palisades). The first connection encountered of this interchange is the Palisades southbound exit ramp, which merges into Lake Welch Parkway southbound. This is followed by ramps to the Palisades southbound and from the Palisades northbound, where Lake Welch Parkway ends. It is only a partial interchange, lacking a connection between Lake Welch Parkway northbound and Palisades Interstate Parkway northbound. To access the Palisades northbound requires a 3-mile detour via Gate Hill Road.

History
Lake Welch Parkway was conceived in the early 1960s as a new  roadway through Harriman State Park. The new  road would connect Lake Welch Beach (which opened in 1962) to the Palisades Interstate Parkway via Tiorati Brook Road. The new roadway would be constructed by the Palisades Interstate Park Commission with a  bridge over Tiorati Creek and two other smaller bridges along the right-of-way. The new parkway would temporarily terminate at Lake Welch Beach, where an extension down to Seven Lakes Drive would be constructed. Engineers estimated the first section of the Lake Welch Parkway to cost $4.13 million (1962 USD) to build, and contracts would be let in Albany on November 16, 1962.

Construction of the second segment between Seven Lakes Drive and Lake Welch Beach was announced in November 1967 with the letting of a contract to County Asphalt Incorporated, a firm based in Tarrytown. The contract was for $2,275,744 (1967 USD) and would construct the final  of Lake Welch Parkway. The firm won the contract as the lowest of four bidders. In addition to the new right-of-way, an additional  of right-of-way would be used to access the extension with Lake Welch Beach. Also included a project was a bridge over then-NY 210 (now CR 106). The slated completion date of the project was December 3, 1969 and would be supervised by the New York State Department of Transportation and its engineer out of Poughkeepsie.

Construction was completed nearly four years later, with the new Lake Welch Parkway opening to traffic on June 27, 1971, a little more than 9 years after the opening of Lake Welch Beach.

Major intersections
The entire route is in Harriman State Park, Rockland County.

References

External links 

Harriman State Park (New York)
Transportation in Rockland County, New York
Parkways in New York (state)